Porumamilla is a village in YSR district of the Indian state of Andhra Pradesh. It is famous for sound quality of burnt  clay bricks near around here. It is located in Porumamilla mandal of Badvel revenue division.

Geography
Porumamilla is located at  near Badvel. It has an average elevation of 176 meters (580 feet).

History

According to the Mahābhārata, Porumamilla got its name from a battle that took place here between Bhima and Bakasura.

References

Villages in Kadapa district